Protopterna eremia is a species of moth of the family Tortricidae. It is found in Japan on the island of Honshu.

The forewings are rust brown, suffused with brown and black brown and with a few darker and paler spots. The ground colour is reduced to slender cream fascia and a subterminal cream spot at the costa followed by smaller spots reaching the apex. There are also silver-blue refractive spots forming lines subterminally. The hindwings are grey brown, darkening towards the peripheries.

References 

Moths described in 1900
Cnephasiini